Brant is a surname. Notable people with the surname include:

 Aaron Brant (b. 1984), American football player
 Alice Dayrell Caldeira Brant (1880–1970), Brazilian writer
 Antony Thomas Brant (b. 1983), English pop singer
 Berle Brant (b. 1989), Estonian footballer
 Beth Brant, Native Canadian Mohawk writer
 David Brant, NCIS investigator
 Everett H. Brant (1885–1954), American politician
 Henry Brant (1913–2008), Canadian-born composer, long-resident in the US
 Isabella Brant (1591–1626), first wife of Peter Paul Rubens
 John Brant (Mohawk chief) (1794–1832), Mohawk chief, son of Joseph
 Jon Brant (b. 1955), American bass player
 Joseph Brant (c. 1743–1807), Mohawk leader
 Lauren Brant (b. 1989), Australian TV personality, member of Hi-5
 Marshall Brant (b. 1955), American baseball player
 Molly Brant (c. 1736–1796), Mohawk leader
 Mike Brant (1947–1975), Israeli pop star
 Monica Brant (b. 1970), American bodybuilder
 Peter M. Brant (b. 1947), American art collector and film producer
 Scott Brant (cricketer) (b. 1983), Zimbabwean cricketer
 Scott Brant (speedway rider) (b. 1969), American speedway racer
 Sebastian Brant (1457–1521), German humanist and satirist
 Shawn Brant, Native Canadian Mohawk activist 
 Tim Brant (b. 1949), American sportscaster

Fictional characters
 Betty Brant, Spider-Man character

See also 
 Brandt (name)